Brandon Riha (born April 26, 1990) is an American professional poker player from Chickamauga, Georgia currently residing in Las Vegas, Nevada. He was Carder England's room mate.

Online poker
Playing under the screen names of "Briha5254" on PokerStars and Full Tilt Poker, Riha's multi table tournament online winnings exceeded $465,000, including a win in the Full Tilt PokerSunday Mulligan for $49,320, a win in the Full Tilt Poker $100 rebuy tournament. Brandon has won the BoDog Sunday Major and final tabled the Cake Poker monthly $250 tournament.

Live poker

The World Series of Poker
Brandon turned 21 shortly after "Black Friday" and moved to Las Vegas to begin his career as a live pro. Brandon had two cashes at the 42nd Annual World series of Poker.

Venetian DeepStacks Extravaganza
Brandon took 2nd place in the 6/21 DeepStacks event for $44,265.

Brandon won the Venetian DeepStacks Extravaganza IV $500 buy in tournament for $33,347

Turning Stone Casino
Riha made his first live appearance at Turning Stone Casino in March 2009 at the March Madness event making a final table and taking 8th place in the $200 turbo for $1,006. Brandon continued his success taking 4th in the East Coast Poker Championship main event for $25,476 and a win in the 2009 Fall Poker Classic for $32,200.

Festa al Lago Classic
Brandon won and took 2nd in back to back Festa $500 tournaments in 2011 for a combined total of $13,385

References

External links
 Pocketfives.com profile
 Hendon Mob profile
 Facebook Fan Page
 
 

American poker players
Living people
1990 births